Abdaikl is an old and rare Russian male first name of Arabic or Persian origin. The patronymics derived from this first name are "" (Abdaiklovich; masculine) and "" (Abdaiklovna; feminine).

References

Notes

Sources
Н. А. Петровский (N. A. Petrovsky). "Словарь русских личных имён" (Dictionary of Russian First Names). ООО Издательство "АСТ". Москва, 2005. 

Masculine given names